Dennis James may refer to:
 Dennis James (1917–1997), American actor and game show host
 Dennis James (bodybuilder) (born 1969), African-American bodybuilder
 Dennis James (musician), American musician prominent in the revival of silent films